Shelton Williams, a native of Odessa, Texas, is a Professor Emeritus of Political Science and International Studies at Austin College in Sherman, Texas. He is also the President of the Osgood Center for International Studies in Washington, D.C. Williams is a specialist in issues relating to nuclear proliferation. He has served as an advisor to the Nuclear Regulatory Commission and also as a special assistant to Madeleine Albright.

Early life

Williams grew up in Odessa, Texas where he graduated from Permian High School. He attended the University of Texas at Austin from 1962 until 1966, graduating Phi Beta Kappa with a B.A. degree and Honors in Government.

After graduating from the University of Texas, Williams attended what is now the Paul H. Nitze School of Advanced International Studies of Johns Hopkins University, located in Washington, D.C. He received a Ph.D. from SAIS in 1971.

Academic career

Williams joined the faculty at Austin College in 1970, serving in the ensuing years as Dean of Social Sciences, Director of the College Honors Program, and Director of the Posey Leadership Institute.

In 2007 Williams joined the faculty of the College of Graduate and Continuing Studies at Norwich University, where he is a Professor in the Master of Arts in Diplomacy (MDY) program.

During the Administration of Jimmy Carter, Williams served for two years (1976 to 1982) in Washington, D.C. as a policy analyst and then special consultant to the Nuclear Regulatory Commission on matters relating to international proliferation. Williams returned to Federal service again during the Bill Clinton Administration when he served as a William C. Foster Visiting Scholar at the Arms Control and Disarmament Agency [ACDA]. ACDA posted him to the US Mission to the UN where he worked with Madeleine Albright, dealing especially with United States representation at the United Nations on nuclear proliferation.

Model United Nations

Williams has been a supporter of the Model United Nations program for over thirty years. The program provides international simulation experiences for college students through regional, national, and international conferences that teach multilateral diplomatic skills. He has served as mentor for dozens of Model United Nations delegations from several schools, including Austin College and the University of Texas at Dallas He twice served on the advisory council of the National Model UN.

Recent Publications

'Washed in the Blood and the Covey Jencks mystery series.

Williams was profoundly affected as a young man by the murder of his one-year-older cousin Betty Williams in 1961, an event much publicized at the time throughout the Southwestern United States and popularly known as the "Kiss and Kill Murder." He devoted years of study to the facts of his cousin's killing and the court trial of her alleged murderer, writing a true crime book about the affair entitled Washed in the Blood. Williams's book made his cousin Betty the subject of magazine and newspaper articles across the southwestern United States.  Williams was one of the on-camera interviewees in 2015 when Investigation Discovery's series A Crime to Remember'' recounted the story in the Season 3 finale, "Bye Bye Betty". Williams also wrote "The Summer of 66," an account of his experience that summer that culminated in the Charles Whitman shootings from the University of Texas Tower. Williams also contributed to "Out of the Blue," a University of Texas Archives oral history of the Whitman massacre on August 1, 1966. In February 2018, Williams published "Covey Jencks," a fictional amateur detective novel based in Odessa. "Covey and JayJay Get Educated" and "The Chinese Murder of Edward Watts" followed. All three books are mysteries, but they also reflect on current social issues like racism and extremism. All three stories are combined in "The Covey Jencks Mysteries: Love and Murder Deep in the Heart of Texas."

The Osgood Center for International Studies

In addition to his academic appointment at Austin College, Williams also serves as the founding president of the Osgood Center for International Studies. This organization, based in Washington, D.C, provides internship opportunities, study experiences, simulation opportunities, and special seminars for college and university students from a variety of countries and backgrounds.

References

External links

Year of birth missing (living people)
Living people
Moody College of Communication alumni
American non-fiction crime writers
American political scientists
International relations scholars
Austin College faculty